Aira Caldera is a gigantic volcanic caldera that is located on the southern end of Kyushu, Japan. It is believed to have been formed about 30,000 years ago with a succession of pyroclastic surges. It is currently the place of residence to over 900,000 people. The shores of Aira Caldera are home to rare flora and fauna, including Japanese bay tree and Japanese black pine. The caldera is home to Mount Sakurajima, and the Mount Kirishima group of stratovolcanoes lies to the north of the caldera. The most famous and active of this group is Shinmoedake. 

Aira Caldera has an underlying magmatic chamber that connects with the Kirishima magmatic system. This has enabled magma from the caldera to feed into the stratovolcano Sakurajima, causing it to expand over time. Thus, Sakurajima has caused a series of disasters such as the eruption in 1914 which killed 58 people  and sank the magma chamber by 60cm.

History

Location 
Aira caldera is located at Kyushu, the southernmost island of Japan. The supervolcano peaks at 1117m3. 

The eruption forming the Aira Caldera, occurred approximately 30,000 years ago, and resulted in tephra and ignimbrite from a vast amount of magma affecting the nearby land.

Aira caldera is surrounded by the major city of Kagoshima which has a population of more than 900,000. Residents do not mind small eruptions because they have measures in place for protection. For example, school students are required to wear hard helmets for protection against falling debris. Additionally, a disaster prevention system with the world's best high-tech volcanic monitory system was put in place. The Caldera is now closely monitored by the Sakurajima Volcano Research Centre which is a part of the University of Kyoto and Disaster Prevention Research Institute. This ensures the safety of the residents and provides a peaceful coexistence with the people of Kagoshima and the active caldera.

Geological background 

Aira Caldera is almost rectangular in shape related to local faulting and was created in a series of large scale of pyroclastic surges that contributed to the Shirasu-Daichi pyroclastic plateau with the last now dated to 29,428 to 30,148 years calibrated before present  although earlier work had the date at ~22,000 years ago with wide possible range from 34,500  to 16,500 years before present. The Aira Caldera is one of a series of volcanic complexs in the Kagoshima Graben which has been postulated to extend northward from the undersea Kikai Caldera to the Ata South Caldera, Ata North Caldera (see Ata Caldera), the Aira Caldera associated with Kagoshima Bay and through past to the Kirishima Volcano Group. This alignment was first noted in the 1940s. The tectonic processes are rather complex in this region where the Okinawa Plate is colliding with the Amur Plate and the Pacific Plate is subducting under both. 

The formation of Aira Caldera started with a Plinian pumice eruption of the Osumi pumice fall from a vent near where Sakurajima is now and was quickly followed by an oxidised Tsumaya pyroclastic flow. It is likely subsequent eruptions in this series were at vents in what has been termed the Wakamiko caldera to the north west. The caldera is known for its gravitational anomalies which is associated with a funnel-like shape in the strata. 

The structure of the caldera seemed unique in early work as it was different from the then typical Valles-type Caldera whose defining characteristics include a Valles-type ring fracture which acts as a channel for such large-scale pyroclastic flows. Such diffuse non directional pyroclastic flows, overwhelming the local landscape, have now also been described in New Zealand, for example in the Hatepe eruption.

Local Impact Ito eruption
Before the initial eruption of 25,000 years ago there was a wide and shallow basin of nearly the same size as the present Aira Caldera occupying the northern end of Kagoshima Bay with an east-west orientation. The topography encompasses the outline of an older caldera so suggesting there were pyroclastic flows that pre-dated the formation of present day Aira Caldera.

The first phase of activity resulted from injection of mafic magmas that destabilized the stored rhyolite magma and was the mainly homogeneous Osumi Pumice Fall (named because the pumice fall extended across the Ōsumi Peninsula to the south east). Above the Osumi pumice fall deposit, is the second phase Tsumaya pyroclastic flow deposit which is wholly confined within the pre-Aira basin. The Tsumaya pyroclastic flow buried the pre-Aira topography such as box canyons (formed by older pyroclastic flow deposits). The Tsumaya pyroclastic flow consists of a "pale pinkish brown glass matrix containing a small amount of pumice and lithic fragments" consistent with the Osumi pumice fall and the Tsumaya pyroclastic flow occurred from the same vent. There was only a very short period between the Tsumaya pyroclastic flow and the formation of the present caldera in the Ito eruption.

In contrast the Ito pyroclastic flow extends outside the basin as well as occupying inside the basin.

Volcanic activity 

The relationship between Aira and Kirishima Magmatic systems

Aira caldera is one of the most active and hazardous calderas in the world. It is home to the Kirishima volcanoes, a group of active volcanoes at the north end of Aira caldera. One of these volcanoes, Shinmoedake, has produced two strong magmato-phreatic eruptions, separated by almost 300 years. Starting in December 2009, active diving and inflation before the outbreak were noticed. A series of sub-plinian events then occurred from January 19th to the 31st. The first phase (eruption climax) was accompanied by a strong co-eruptive deflation. 

Aira Caldera may respond to small eruptions that come from a common reservoir. However, not all the volcanic systems are connected all the time as magma pathways open and close. The connection between Aira and Kirishima represents the clearest example of volcano interconnectivity revealed by geodetic monitoring. The inflation of one volcano can enhance the eruption probability of a neighbouring volcano. The subduction of the Philippine sea plate beneath the Eurasian plate is the reason for the active volcanism.

Aira Caldera and Kirishima's magma storage is linked through tunnels that extend horizontally over tens of kilometers which is able to be explained through the presence of hotspots. However, the volcanic systems are not always connected since the magma pathways open and close. For example, the Shinmoedake vertical connection was closed for approximately 300 years until reactivation.

The changes in volume for the Aira and Kirishima systems suggest they had different inflation and deflation periods. Between 2009 and 2013, there was evidence of inflation in the Aira system. However, after the 2011 eruption at Kirishima, the Aira system experienced a deflation. This was Aira caldera's only deflation between 2009 and 2013.

Inflation of Aira Caldera 
The magma storage underlying Aira Caldera has been feeding into the stratovolcano Sakurajima, expanding over time. However, there have been points in time where the chamber has deflated as a result of eruptions releasing the pressure built which cannot be explained by stress changes. Thus, it has been described as a consequence of magma withdrawing from the Aira system when Kirishima was replenishing. A prime example is the Sakurajima eruption in 1914 (approximately 1.5km3 in volume), which caused the magma chamber to sink 60cm. 58 people were killed in the eruption. For this amount of magma to erupt, it would take approximately 130 years for the chamber to refill as according to Dr James Hickey and his co-authors. Dr Hickey stated "These results were made possible by combining data from various monitoring methods and applying them to new numerical modelling techniques, moving away from older modelling methods that have been in use since the 1950s."

Nevertheless, there are continuous measurements of the ground movement that indicate the area is now inflating. Recent GPS deformation measurements, amalgamated with geophysical data and computer modelling enable the reconstruction of the magma system beneath the caldera. Through this, Dr James Hickey and his co-authors were able to create a depiction of the tunnels beneath the caldera. 

They discovered that magma is filling the magma chamber at a faster rate than the Sakurajima volcano erupts. The reservoir is expanding each year as a volume of 14 million m3 is supplied to the system. Dr Haruhisa Nakamichi, Associate Professor at the Disaster Prevention Research Institute, Kyoto University, and co-author, said: "It is already passed by 100 years since the 1914 eruption, less than 30 years is left until a next expected big eruption, Kagoshima city office has prepared new evacuation plans from Sakurajima, after experiences of evacuation of the crisis in August 2015."

A group of scientists led by Dr Dominique Remy used Synthetique Aperture Radar (SAR) to detect levels of inflation of Aira Caldera over the Kokubu urban district. They observed a change in the pattern of Kokubu's surface. Through a model of the deformation field of the caldera, it is predicted there is "a maximum volume increase of 203 x 106m3 between 1995 and 1998."

Flora and fauna 
The plants near Sakurajima regrow after eruptions. The Japanese bay trees and Japanese black pines are two species which grow furthest away. These plants are able to repopulate; however they cannot withstand the debris and pumice after an eruption. Eurya japonica and Alnus firma can be found in the middle ground away from the peak. They are able to grow back from an eruption and withstand its destruction more than the vegetation furthest away. Japanese Pampas grass and knotweed are located closest to the volcano. They respond quickly after an eruption and form a meadow of mosses and lichens during regrowth. Nevertheless, It takes many years for the forest to regrow. This enables people to observe the changes of vegetation from the different eruptions in different eras. 

Kagoshima Bay (Kinko Bay) is home to much wildlife; including 1000 different species of fish, a population of dolphins, as well as rare creatures such as the Satsumahaorimushi tube worm. Rare minerals exist on the sea bottom with hydrothermal vents including volcanic chimneys.

References

Volcanoes of Kyushu
VEI-7 volcanoes
Calderas of Kyushu
Submarine calderas
Pleistocene calderas
Active volcanoes
Supervolcanoes
Volcanoes of Kagoshima Prefecture
Paleolithic Japan